Aldisa puntallanensis is a species of sea slug or dorid nudibranch, a marine gastropod mollusk in the family Cadlinidae.

Distribution 
This species was described from La Gomera in the Canary Islands.

Description

Ecology

References

Cadlinidae
Gastropods described in 2011